Habenaria triplonema, commonly known as the twisted rein orchid, is a species of orchid that is endemic to northern Australia. It two or three leaves at its base and up to twenty five yellowish, strongly scented flowers.

Description 
Habenaria triplonema is a tuberous, perennial herb with between two and three bright green leaves. The petals are a similar size to the lateral sepals. Flowering occurs from February to March.

Taxonomy and naming
Habenaria triplonema was first formally described in 1911 by Rudolf Schlechter from a specimen collected from Port Darwin and the description was published in Repertorium specierum novarum regni vegetabilis.

Distribution and habitat
The twisted rein is found in northern parts of the Northern Territory, in the Kimberley region of Western Australia, between Ingham and Rockhampton in Queensland, on some Torres Strait Islands and in New Guinea. It grows in open forest and woodland, sometimes near swamps and often with tall grasses.

References

Orchids of the Northern Territory
Orchids of Queensland
Orchids of Western Australia
Orchids of New Guinea
Endemic orchids of Australia
Plants described in 1911
triplonema